Atriplex truncata is a species of saltbush known by the common names wedgeleaf saltbush, wedgescale, and wedge orach, native to western North America from British Columbia to California and to New Mexico. It grows in montane to desert habitats with saline soils, such as dry lake beds.

Description 
Atriplex truncata is an annual herb producing erect, angled stems which can be higher than 70 centimeters. Leaves are 1 to 4 centimeters long and wedge-shaped. The stems and herbage are generally very scaly and scurfy. Male and female flowers are produced in small clusters in the leaf axils.

References

External links
Jepson Manual Treatment
USDA Plants Profile for Atriplex truncata (wedgescale saltbush)
Photo gallery

truncata
Halophytes
Flora of the Northwestern United States
Flora of Western Canada
Flora of British Columbia
Flora of California
Flora of Colorado
Flora of Nevada
Flora of New Mexico
Flora of Utah
Flora of the California desert regions
Flora of the Great Basin
Flora of the Rocky Mountains
Flora of the Sierra Nevada (United States)
Natural history of the Mojave Desert
Natural history of the Transverse Ranges
Plants described in 1871
Flora without expected TNC conservation status